The 1980 Cleveland Browns season was the team's 35th overall, and 31st season in the National Football League. The Browns finished the regular season with eleven wins and five losses, and their first division title since 1971, winning a tiebreaker with the Houston Oilers.
The 1980 Browns were known as the Kardiac Kids for having several games decided in the final moments. The 1980 season was the first time that Cleveland had qualified for the postseason since 1972. Also, for the second straight year, Browns head coach Sam Rutigliano was named NFL Coach of the Year, and quarterback Brian Sipe was named the league's Most Valuable Player.

Rallying from a 10–0 first-half deficit against Cincinnati, the Browns came back to beat the Bengals 27–24 and finally snare the Central championship when Don Cockroft kicked the game-winning 22-yard field goal with 1:25 left. The Bengals tried to come back and got as far as the Cleveland 14-yard line before time ran out.

The Browns played their first home playoff game in nine seasons against the Raiders, in what has become known as the Red Right 88 game. The Browns marched to the Oakland 13 in the waning seconds trailing by 14–12, but Brian Sipe's pass into the end zone for Hall of Fame tight end Ozzie Newsome was intercepted, ending Cleveland's season.

Five players had 50 or more receptions, led by running back Mike Pruitt. Pruitt also rushed for 1,034 yards and six touchdowns. Running back Calvin Hill, recorded six touchdowns among his 27 catches. Wide receiver Ricky Feacher grabbed just 10 passes, but four went for scores, including two within a matter of minutes in the division-clinching win over the Bengals.

Offseason

NFL Draft

Regular season

Schedule 

Note: Intra-division opponents are in bold text.

Game summaries

Week 3 

    
    
    
    
    
    

 Charles White 7 Rec, 100 Yds

Week 7 vs. Green Bay Packers 
 The Browns rallied from down 21-13 in the fourth quarter, first on Ozzie Newsome’s touchdown catch from Brian Sipe, then facing third and 20 from the Packers' 46 yard line with 16 seconds left Sipe completed a pass to Dave Logan for the winning touchdown. Browns 26, Packers 21

Week 8 vs. Pittsburgh Steelers 
 Sipe and company erased three two-score deficits - 10–0, 20–7, and 26–14 - to defeat the Steelers in Cleveland. Ozzie Newsome hauled in the winning catch with 5:35 to play. Browns 27, Steelers 26

Week 9 vs. Chicago Bears 
 Although Mike Pruitt's 56-yard touchdown run ultimately wins the game for Cleveland, Sipe throws for 298 yards and reaches a milestone in Browns history, becoming the Browns' all-time passing leader in NFL play. Browns 27, Bears 21

Week 10 at Baltimore Colts 
 A missed PAT by the Colts proved the difference in a 28-27 Browns win as both teams combined for eight touchdowns. Bert Jones had three scores for the Colts but was sacked five times.

Week 11 at Pittsburgh Steelers 
 Seeking their first ever win at Pittsburgh's Three Rivers Stadium, the Browns once again were denied, this time on a Terry Bradshaw to Lynn Swann touchdown with eleven seconds left. It was the Browns' 11th consecutive defeat at Pittsburgh. Steelers 16, Browns 13

Week 13 at Houston Oilers 
 The Browns edged the Oilers 17-14 in what had become a de facto three-way tie atop the AFC Central. The Browns were out gained in yardage by 126 but five Oilers turnovers were the key.

Week 14 vs. New York Jets 
 Once again the Cardiac Browns had to rally, this time down 14-10 in the fourth, this time on a five-yard Greg Pruitt touchdown catch.

Week 15 at Minnesota Vikings 
 In a game known to Vikings fans as the "Miracle at the Met", the Browns relinquish a 23–9 lead with only 7:15 remaining. The game is probably most remembered for Browns Safety Thom Darden's deflection of Tommy Kramer's "Hail Mary pass", which is caught by Ahmad Rashad as time expires. Kramer's 456 passing yards were the most ever given up by the Browns. Vikings 28, Browns 23

Week 16 at Cincinnati Bengals 
 Needing a win to secure the Central Division title, the Browns rallied against the Bengals 27–24. The game lead tied or changed six times as Don Cockroft's game-winning field goal came with 1:25 left to play. Browns 27, Bengals 24

Standings

Personnel

Staff / Coaches

Roster

Son of the Kardiac Kids 
The 2007 Cleveland Browns had a season similar to the Kardiac Kids, with several games being decided in the final minutes or in overtime. One game in particular against the Baltimore Ravens, which the Browns won in overtime because of a reversed call on a field goal by kicker Phil Dawson, led the Cleveland Plain Dealer to publish an editorial calling the 2007 Browns "The 'Son of the Kardiac Kids'" . The similarities have been at least acknowledged by the organization, with offensive coordinator Rob Chudzinski being quoted in the article calling his team "The Kardiac Kids' little brother."

Postseason

AFC Divisional Playoff 
 Oakland Raiders 14, Cleveland Browns 12

at Cleveland Stadium, Cleveland, Ohio

 TV: NBC
 Attendance: 77,655

Red Right 88 

AFC Divisional Playoff Game (Home) January 4, 1981 – Browns 12, Oakland Raiders 14
In sub-zero conditions on Cleveland's windy Lakefront, the Browns and Raiders battled into the waning moments of the contest. Down 14–12 and having mounted a 72-yard drive, the Browns were within striking distance at the Oakland 13-yard line with less than a minute remaining. Although it was only second down, Don Cockroft had already missed two field goal attempts in the swirling winds. Browns Coach Sam Rutigliano chose a more aggressive strategy, opting to go for the kill and pass the ball on second down instead of conservatively running the ball and then, perhaps, settling for a last second field goal. The play called was Red Right 88, which was intended for Dave Logan. However, Ozzie Newsome managed to get clear in the Raiders endzone and Sipe fired the ball to him—but the wind managed to interfere with the plan and heartbreak was the outcome for the frozen 77,655 Cleveland faithful: the ball was intercepted by Oakland Cornerback Mike Davis. The 1980 season will be remembered fondly albeit bittersweet, but the game would go down in Browns history (along with The Drive and The Fumble) as one of the franchises sadder moments.

Awards and records 
 Brian Sipe, NFL MVP
 Brian Sipe, PFWA MVP
 Brian Sipe, UPI AFL-AFC Offensive Player of the Year
 Brian Sipe, AFC Leader, Touchdown Passes (30), Tied with another player
 Sam Rutigliano, UPI NFL Coach of the Year

References 

 
 Browns on jt-sw.com

External links 
 1980 Cleveland Browns at Pro Football Reference
 1980 Cleveland Browns Statistics at jt-sw.com
 1980 Cleveland Browns Schedule at jt-sw.com
 1980 Cleveland Browns at DatabaseFootball.com  

Cleveland
Cleveland Browns seasons
AFC Central championship seasons
1980 in sports in Ohio